Ezzatollah Akbari Zarinkolaei (born 20 August 1992 in Juybar, Iran) is an Iranian wrestler.

References

External links 

1992 births
Living people
Iranian male sport wrestlers
Wrestlers at the 2014 Asian Games
Asian Games medalists in wrestling
Asian Games silver medalists for Iran
World Wrestling Championships medalists
People from Juybar
Medalists at the 2014 Asian Games
Sportspeople from Mazandaran province
21st-century Iranian people